Letnica may refer to:

Letnica, Gdańsk, one of the quarters of the city of Gdańsk, Poland
Letnica, Lubusz Voivodeship, a village in western Poland
Letnica, West Pomeranian Voivodeship, a village in northwestern Poland
, a village in the Vitina Municipality of southern Kosovo
Letnica (river), a river of Poland

See also
Ohrid trout (Salmo letnica), a species of fish
Letnitsa, a town in northern Bulgaria